Sea Level was an American rock band from Macon, Georgia. Formed in 1976, the band was an offshoot of the Allman Brothers Band. Between 1977 and 1980, the band released five studio albums which incorporated elements of funk, blues and Latin music.

Sea Level took on a life of its own as tensions grew between Gregg Allman and other members resulting in the loss of two of ABBs founding members. After the Allman Brothers Band broke up when Gregg Allman and Dickey Betts left, the remaining members who evolved into Sea Level were "We Three" comprising bassist Lamar Williams, drummer Jaimoe and piano player Chuck Leavell.  The trio would occasionally open shows for the group in 1975 and 1976.  The trio added guitarist Jimmy Nalls and took their name from the phonetic pun of their new bandleader Chuck Leavell's name:  "C. Leavell."  They toured relentlessly, experimenting and refining their sound, eventually signing with Capricorn Records (home of the Allman Brothers) and recording their self-titled debut album in 1977.

Musical style 
Sea Level's music fuses elements of funk, blues, Latin and rock music. A jam band, Sea Level's sound has been classified as southern rock, jazz rock, and funk pop.

Career
After the release of their first album, the group expanded to a septet with the additions of Davis Causey (guitar), George Weaver (drums, percussion) and Randall Bramblett (saxophones, keyboards and vocals). That configuration recorded the group's second album, Cats on the Coast, in 1978 (with the leadoff track, "That's Your Secret", reaching #50 on the Billboard Hot 100 and #45 in Canada.)  By the time of the third album, On the Edge, Jaimoe and Weaver had both left, replaced by Joe English.  The sextet of Bramblett, Causey, English, Leavell, Nalls and Williams recorded the fourth album, Long Walk on a Short Pier (1979), unreleased in the United States for nearly twenty years, adding percussionist Matt Greeley for their fifth and final album, Ball Room, issued on Arista in 1980.  Their greatest hits album (CD) wrapped up their body of work, minus a handful of appearances on various compilation albums (mostly Southern Rock).  They were also featured on a 1978 live Southern Rock album which included a live version of "Grand Larceny."

Later years
Leavell later emerged as a much sought-after session musician and producer, touring with Eric Clapton and eventually becoming a "permanent" session player touring with the Rolling Stones.

In 1998, he issued his debut solo LP, a Christmas album called What's in That Bag? and more recently Forever Blue that includes solo versions of two classic Sea Level compositions: "Whole Lotta Colada" and "Song for Amy."  He also released Southscape, an album of Southern anthems that hearkens back to his Southern roots.

A documentary of Chuck Leavell's career and life outside of music,"Chuck Leavell: The Tree Man" IMDb Listing,  directed by Allen Farst IMDb, premiered at Dayton, Ohio's "The Neon" theatre on November 6, 2020. The film, featured in a number of film festivals in 2020, won the Sedona Film Festival's People’s Choice Award. 

The film, featuring Mick Jagger, Keith Richards, Charlie Watts, Ronnie Wood, David Gilmore, Dickey Betts, Warren Haynes, John Mayer, Julian Lennon, Billy Bob Thornton, Charlie Daniels, Bonnie Raitt, Bruce Hornsby, Chris Robinson, Miranda Lambert, Eric Church, Mike Mills, Pat Monahan, John Popper, and Lee Ann Womack among others will be available for streaming beginning December 1, 2020. Chuck Leavell: The Tree Man website

Deaths of members
Lamar Williams died from lung cancer on January 21, 1983, at age 34.

Jimmy Nalls, who suffered from Parkinson's disease, died on June 22, 2017, at age 66.

Davis Causey died on February 19, 2023, at the age of 74.

Discography
 Sea Level (1977, Capricorn)
 Cats on the Coast (1977, Capricorn)
 On the Edge (1978, Capricorn)
 Long Walk on a Short Pier (1979, Capricorn)
 Ball Room (1980, Arista)
 Best of Sea Level (1990, Polydor)
 Best of Sea Level (1997, Capricorn)

Group members
 Chuck Leavell – piano, Moog synthesizer, organ, clavinet, keyboards, percussion, vocals (1976–1980)
 Lamar Williams – bass, vocals (1976–1980)
 Jimmy Nalls – guitars, vocals (1976–1980)
 Jaimoe – drums, percussion (1976–1978)
 Davis Causey – guitars (1977–1980)
 Randall Bramblett – saxophones, piano, keyboards, vocals (1977–1980)
 George Weaver – drums (1977–1978)
 Joe English – drums, percussion, vocals (1978–1980)
 Matt Greeley – percussion, vocals (1980)

Timeline

References

External Links
 

American southern rock musical groups
American jazz-rock groups
Jam bands
Rock music groups from Georgia (U.S. state)
Capricorn Records artists
Musical groups established in 1976
Musical groups disestablished in 1981
1976 establishments in Georgia (U.S. state)
1981 disestablishments in Georgia (U.S. state)